Johann Benedict Listing (25 July 1808 – 24 December 1882) was a German mathematician.

J. B. Listing was born in Frankfurt and died in Göttingen. He first introduced the term "topology" to replace the older term "geometria situs" (also called sometimes "Analysis situs"), in a famous article published in 1847, although he had used the term in correspondence some years earlier. He (independently) discovered the properties of the Möbius strip, or half-twisted strip, at the same time (1858) as August Ferdinand Möbius, and  went further in exploring the properties of strips with higher-order twists (paradromic rings). He discovered topological invariants which came to be called Listing numbers.

In ophthalmology, Listing's law describes an essential element of extraocular eye muscle coordination.

In geodesy, he coined in 1872 the term geoid for the idealized geometric surface of the figure of the Earth.

References

External links
 
 A reprint of (part of) his famous 1847 article introducing  Topology, published in Vorstudien zur Topologie, Vandenhoeck und Ruprecht, Göttingen, pp. 67, 1848.

1808 births
1882 deaths
19th-century German mathematicians
Scientists from Frankfurt
Topologists
Fellows of the Royal Society of Edinburgh